Jakhapura Junction railway station is a railway station on the East Coast Railway network in the state of Odisha, India. It serves Jakhapura village. Its code is JKPR. It has three platforms. Passenger, Express trains halt at Jakhapura Junction railway station.

Major trains

 Puri–Barbil Express
 Visakhapatnam–Tatanagar Weekly Superfast Express

See also
 Jajpur district

References

Railway stations in Jajpur district
Khurda Road railway division